The cartridge box was a box to carry cartridges. It was worn on the soldier's right hip, on a belt in front of the soldier's belly ("ventral cartridge box", "gargoussier"), or on a shoulder belt.

References

Pistol and rifle cartridges
Ammunition
Personal military carrying equipment